Linau Mukim (also known as Mukim 6) is a mukim located in Batu Pahat district in Johor. Batu Pahat district is divided into 14 parishes, each of which encompasses several villages.

Villages 
Mukim Linau comprises the following populated village, among them are:

 Kampung Parit Banyumas
 Kampung Seri Teluk
 Kampung Parit Suratman
 Kampung Bindu
 Kampung Parit Senah
 Kampung Parit Hitam Khamis
 Kampung Parit Yob Darat
 Kampung Parit Yaani
 Kampung Parit Andih
 Kampung Parit Jambi
 Kampung Seri Bengkal
 Kampung Parit Yaani Tengah
 Kampung Seri Binjai
 Kampung Mohd Noor
 Kampung Parit Lahak
 Kampung Parit Beleman
 Kampung Parit Jabong
 Kampung Parit Kassim

References

External links 
 Pejabat Daerah Batu Pahat.
 Pecahan daerah Batu Pahat.

Mukims of Batu Pahat District